Princeville is a city in the Canadian province of Quebec, located in L'Érable Regional County Municipality in the Centre-du-Québec region.

The population was 6,001 as of the Canada 2016 Census.

History
The county of Stanfold (Princeville) was created by Édouard Leclerc on July 9, 1807 when he established himself on lot 6, rang 12 in Princeville. A monument was erected in his honour on the east section of the 12th rang. Stanfold then had a new division that would become the village of Princeville in 1856. Thus two municipalities would now co-existed.

On February 23, 2000, the municipalities of the city of Princeville and the parish of Princeville become one to form the new city of Princeville.

Demographics 

References

External links
 Official website of the city of Princeville, Québec

Cities and towns in Quebec
Incorporated places in Centre-du-Québec